KIBL (1490 AM) is a radio station broadcasting a country music format. Licensed to Beeville, Texas, United States, the station serves the Corpus Christi area. The station is currently owned by David Martin Phillip, through licensee Rufus Resources, LLC.
On April 20, 2019, KIBL flipped from Spanish Christian programming to the country "No Bull Radio Network" owned by Rufus Resources. It had previously been owned by La Radio Cristiana Network.

References

External links
No Bull Radio Our Stations Website

FCC History Cards for KIBL

IBL
IBL
Radio stations established in 1989
1989 establishments in Texas